Li Chunting (born October 1936) is a Chinese politician who served as governor of Shandong from 1995 to 2001.

He was an alternate member of the 14th Central Committee of the Chinese Communist Party and a member of the 15th Central Committee of the Chinese Communist Party. He was a member of the Standing Committee of the 9th and 10th National People's Congress.

Biography
Li was born in Qixia County, Shandong, in October 1936. He graduated from Chengdu Technological University.

In 1957, he became a sent-down youth in his home-county. He joined the Chinese Communist Party (CCP) in 1958. In April 1968, during the Cultural Revolution, he forced to work in the fields but soon reinstated in September 1969. In January 1974, he was promoted to become party secretary of Yantai, a position he held until September 1976, when he was appointed director of the Shandong Metallurgical Bureau. He was manager and party branch secretary of Shandong Metallurgical Industry Corporation in October 1983, and held that office until February 1988. He served as deputy governor of Shandong in February 1988, and seven years later promoted to the governor position. He also served as deputy party secretary of Shandong from February 1992 to December 2001 and director of Shandong Provincial Structural Reform Commission from March 1991 to February 1995. In December 2001, he took office as vice chairperson of the National People's Congress Agriculture and Rural Affairs Committee, a post he kept until March 2008.

References

1968 births
Living people
People from Yantai
Governors of Shandong
People's Republic of China politicians from Jiangsu
Chinese Communist Party politicians from Jiangsu
Alternate members of the 14th Central Committee of the Chinese Communist Party
Members of the 15th Central Committee of the Chinese Communist Party
Members of the Standing Committee of the 9th National People's Congress
Members of the Standing Committee of the 10th National People's Congress